Costunolide synthase is an enzyme with systematic name germacra-1(10),4,11(13)-trien-12-oate,NADPH:oxygen oxidoreductase (6alpha-hydroxylating). This enzyme catalyses the following chemical reaction

 germacra-1(10),4,11(13)-trien-12-oate + NADPH + H+ + O2  (+)-costunolide + NADP+ + 2 H2O

Costunolide synthase is a heme-thiolate protein (P-450).

References

External links 
 

EC 1.14.13